Yan Serhiyovych Osadchyi (born 1 January 1994) is a Ukrainian professional footballer who plays as a right back for club Redditch United.

Career
In July 2022, Osadchyi joined Southern League Premier Division Central club Redditch United after impressing the club on trial. The move came after Osadchyi fled his native country to settle in Worcester with his partner following the 2022 Russian invasion of Ukraine.

References

External links
 Profile on Alians Lypova Dolyna official website
 
 

1994 births
Living people
Sportspeople from Sumy
Ukrainian footballers
Association football defenders
FC Solli Plyus Kharkiv players
FC Alians Lypova Dolyna players
Redditch United F.C. players
Ukrainian First League players
Ukrainian Second League players
Ukrainian Amateur Football Championship players
Ukrainian expatriate footballers
Expatriate footballers in England
Ukrainian expatriate sportspeople in England